Tsholotsho, originally known as Tjolotjo, is a district in Matabeleland North province in Zimbabwe.  Its administrative centre is at Tsholotsho business centre which is located about 98 km north-west of Bulawayo. Districts around Tsholotsho include Lupane, Hwange, Umguza, and Bulilima. The Manzamnyama River separates Tsholotsho from Bulilima District, whilst the Gwayi River separates it from Umguza and Lupane districts, and the Hwange National Park separates it from Hwange District.

History 
The area was a favourite of the elephant herds and had attracted early ivory hunters. The area was occupied by the Bakalanga and San people before Mzilikazi and his Ndebele people arrived here. The name "Tsholotsho" (old spelling "Tjolotjo") being derived from the San word "Tsoro o tso" meaning the head of an elephant. Among the pre-Mzilikazi chiefs of the area were Tategulu, Makulukusa, and Madlangombe. It was part of the Kingdom of Butua and the king or mambo madlimbewu or dlimbewu was based at Khami at the time. Most villages in Tsholotsho have pure Bakalanga names. Later it became part of the Rozvi Empire.

When the Matabele arrived in 1838  they adopted the name "Tsholotsho".  Mzilikazi loved the vast grazing land and left it under the watchful eyes of one of his trusted paramount chiefs, Maqhekeni Sithole, when he moved to Matopo to meet up with the rest of the Ndebele group. Chief Gampu Sithole, the great great grand son of Maqhekeni is one of the 5 raining chiefs today. The area has vast grazing lands there and people in Tsholotsho usually take their cattle for fattening in some of the popular grazing lands and they call it ukulagisa.

The district centre of Tsholotsho is situated about 65 kilometres west of Nyamandlovu in the former Gwayi Tribal Trust land. It has been an administrative centre for the trust land for many years and fell under the jurisdiction of the Native Commissioner for Nyamandlovu who first assumed responsibility in 1909. Prior to this date the area fell under the jurisdiction of the Superintendent of Natives at Bulawayo.

The District Service Centre is linked to Bulawayo and Lupane by tarred roads and Plumtree by a gravel road and other roads lead through very heavy Kalahari sands (itshebetshebe) into the Gwayi Tribal Trust areas and beyond into the forest reserves. The soils around the precincts of the village are regosols derived from Kalahari sands and shallow rocky basalt-derived pockets are to be found in the district. There is a belt of alluvium along the Gwayi river which has led numerous prospectors in the search of minerals and precious and semi-precious stones. An industrial school was founded at Mavela in 1921 by H. S. Keigwin, who also had a hand in establishing a similar institution at Domboshawa in Mashonaland the following year. The original course was designed by E. D. Alvord, who was then an agricultural missionary at Mount Selinda, where he had started instructing African students on similar lines in 1920. The school was moved to Essexvale (Esigodini) between the years 1941 and 1944 and renamed "Esikhoveni Agricultural Institute". It is fitting that Mr. Alvord's son D. L. Alvord should have been appointed the principal of the college.

After the college was transferred to Essexvale, the vacated land was used as an experimental substation of the Matopos Research Station, where the work is primarily concerned with the breeding of indigenous Nkone or 'Nguni' cattle. These animals which originally came from Eswatini and Zululand were brought by the Matabele during their northward migrations in the first half of the 19th century. These cattle are believed to have originated from a shorthorn-sanga cross. The name sanga was applied to the giant horned cattle of Abyssinia. The head and horns form the principal conformational features by which the breed is identified; their most characteristic feature when mature, being the lyre-shape.

Geography

Geology 
Tsholotsho is located in an area which once used to be a waterlogged basin over 250 million years ago. This basin can be traced as far north as Hwange and is responsible for the formation of the coal deposits in Hwange. Tsholotsho has two principal rivers which are Manzamnyama and Gwayi. The rivers are relatively wide being over 100m in places but usually only flow during the rains.

Tsholotsho is composed of mainly three types of soils. The Kalahari Sands cover over 70% of the Tsholotsho land area. These are located on the North Western areas of Tsholotsho from Korodziba through Dlamini right up to Jimila. The Kalahari Sands can also be found in the North-Central areas like Sipepa and Kapani. The rich black Clay soils are found in a 4 km wide belt stretching about 2 km either side of Gwayi River in what can be called "The Gwayi River flood plain". This area is prone to flooding as in the case of Mahlaba and waterlogging as in the case of Shakiwa (Matemaule). The red clay soils can be found in the south-eastern areas of Tsholotsho right from Somgqibe through Mapulubusi, Madona and right up to Ngqoya.

Flora and fauna 
Tsholotsho is home to hardwoods such as the teak, these being found in the Kalahari sands. The clays are home to the thorn acacia and extensively covered grassland areas. Being located next to the massive Hwange National Park, Tsholotsho is home to basically all the animal species found in Zimbabwe, these being the elephants, buffaloes, lions, kudus and hundreds of other species.

Population 
Tsholotsho is home to three ethnic groups, these being the Ndebele, Kalanga  (along the Manzamnyama river) and the San (closer to the Hwange national park.The principal language is Ndebele which is spoken and understood by practically everyone in the district.

Economy 
The main economic activity in Tsholotsho is farming. The soils are bad for cultivation except the black clay soils along Gwayi River. The Kalahari sands are surprisingly good for cattle rearing though they need massive investment in terms of reliable water provision and disease prevention. Alternatives to farming and cattle raising are few, often the gold mines and farms of South Africa offer the only solution, hence the massive migration to South Africa from this district. The district has a food poverty prevalence of 45%.

An industrial school was founded here in 1921 but was relocated to Esigodini in 1941 and the old buildings taken over by the Matopos Research Station where cattle breeding is researched.

Beginning in the 2010s, efforts have been make to exploit the native wildlife via ecotourism.

Transport and communication 
Tsholotsho District has a relatively expensive road network system. Most of the roads are however unusable due to the extensive Kalahari sands covering the district. The road from Bulawayo to Tsholotsho District's main business centre is a tarred strip road for 103 km of its 117 km length. Upon reaching the Business Centre it branches into three main branches which further subdivide into smaller roads. Of note is the main road from the Business Centre to the Bulawayo - Victoria Falls highway which is now a tarred double lane road. The road passes through Madona ,Dumbo,Mapulubusi,Nembe, Jimila, Tshino, Mcetshwa, Sipepa Business Centre, Gwayi Siding all the way to the Bulawayo – Victoria Falls highway. This road branches at Nembe; with a dirt road branching to the northwest later joining the main road at Sipepa business centre. The distance from Tsholotsho Business Centre to Sipepa Business centre is 113 km by this road as compared to 72 km when using the main road.

Another road leaves the Tsholotsho Business Centre in a westerly direction later branching about four times. The first branch is a road to Plumtree passing through Ehampeni, Mhlahlo, Emlotheni, Dinyane, Mbamba, Bubude, Matshangane and other villages. Another branch heads as far as Phelandaba passing through Magotsha Somgqibe Mazibisa  Dlamini Mswigana Somlotha and other notable villages.

Yet another branch goes beyond Butabubili, passing through Mgodi Masili and having a turnoff to the Seventh-day-Adventist-run Nemani Mission. Most of these roads link in places forming a surprisingly sophisticated web for a district generally regarded as poor.

Government and politics 
Tsholotsho is a well known "battle ground" of Zimbabwean politics with the latest event being the so-called Tsholotsho Declaration of 2005 involving leading ZANU-PF members and Jonathan Moyo, in which they were accused of mooting a boardroom removal of President Mugabe.  It was the location of a mass killing in 1983, as part of Robert Mugabe's "Gukurahundi". Moyo, who twice served as lnformation Minister in the ZANU-PF government, was elected as an Independent MP for Tsholotsho in 2005. The first MP of the area between 1980 and 1985 was John Nkomo who represented one part of the district that was combined with Bulawayo's Luveve Constituency while David Kwidini represented another part that was combined with the neighbouring Wankie District. Between 1985 and 1990 the district was represented by Amos Mkwananzi. Cain Mathema was the last Zanu PF MP before the advent of the MDC from 1990 to 2000. Cain Mathema lost the seat to MDC's Mtoliki Sibanda in 2000. The district was then divided into two constituencies of Tsholotsho South and North with Moyo (independent) narrowly retaining the latter while Maxwell Dube of the MDC winning the former in the 2008 harmonised elections. In 2013 Rosemary Sipepa Nkomo of MDC beat Moyo to become the new MP for Tsholotsho North only to lose it two years later when the MDC suffered a split. Tsholotsho South went Madodana Sibanda of Zanu PF while Moyo bounced back as Tsholotsho North MP (this time as a Zanu PF candidate) in a by-election boycotted by all major parties in 2015.

Notable people 
NoViolet Bulawayo – award-winning writer, author of We Need New Names
Joel Luphahla – former Zimbabwe international player, who played for many top football teams such as Madona Rollers fc Highlanders FC, Supersport United, Platinum Stars, Tsholotsho FC
Mkhululi Chimoio – a prominent investigative journalist from Mvundlana Line who was charged with Treason, Undermining Authority of the Presidency, Sabotage and Subversion in absentia by the President Robert Mugabe regime in 2014 after being framed by some members in the State as “Baba Jukwa” – a faceless social media whistle blower that exposed Mugabe's evil deeds
Cain Mathema – former MP for Tsholotsho and current minister of home affairs and cultural heritage
Jonathan Moyo – former MP and minister of information and education
Joshua Nkomo – late former vice president (1990–1999) of Zimbabwe and ZAPU
Zinjaziyamluma – the first singer of umaskandi ft south African singers such as Bonakele and many more

References

 
Districts of Matabeleland North Province